Longzihu is a metro station of Zhengzhou Metro Line 1. The station is located beneath the crossing of Mingli Road and Ping'an Avenue, on the center island of Longzi Lake.

Station layout 
The station has 2 floors underground. The B1 floor is for the station concourse and the B2 floor is for the platforms and tracks. The station has one island platform and two tracks for Line 1.

Exits

Surroundings
Henan Police College (河南警察学院)
Henan Agricultural University Longzihu campus (河南农业大学龙子湖校区)

References

Stations of Zhengzhou Metro
Line 1, Zhengzhou Metro
Railway stations in China opened in 2017